Mercedes Alonso García (born 10 December 1964) is a Spanish politician of the Partido Popular. She served as mayor of Elche from 2011 through 2015.

Biography 

Alonso was born on 10 December 1964 in Cortes de Baza, Province of Granada. She graduated with a degree in law from the University of Alicante. She has affiliated with the People's Alliance Party since 1982. Alonso has served as councilor of the municipality of Elche since 1991, as well as Provincial deputy of Alicante, responsible for Women and Youth from 1995 to 1999. She was Vice-president of the Diputación Provincial de Alicante and deputy spokesperson since July 2007.

Alson served as deputy for Alicante during the VI legislature of the Corts Valencianes and by the same circumscription, in the IX legislature of the Cortes Generales. In 2011, Alonso became the first woman mayor of Elche, ending 32 years in a row of a Spanish Socialist Workers' Party government.

References

External links 

1964 births
Living people
Members of the 9th Congress of Deputies (Spain)
People from the Province of Granada
Women mayors of places in Spain
21st-century Spanish women politicians
University of Alicante alumni